Terdal is a Municipal town in Bagalkot district in the Indian state of Karnataka.

Geography

It has an average elevation of 536 metres (1758 feet).
Terdal Shree Allam Prabhu Devaru Brahanmath is famous and historic.

Demographics
 India census, Teradala had a population of 26,153. Males constitute 51% of the population and females 49%. The average literacy rate is 54%, lower than the national average of 59.5%: male literacy is 63%, and female literacy is 44%. 14% of the population is under 6 years of age.

Education 
Education institutes in terdal are as follow
 Shri jinasenacharya vidyamandal,Gurukul
 Danigond school and college,DGI
 Siddeswhar school & college
 Nilakanteshwar school
 S.P.school & college
 It is now known for flourishing medical education. with two Ayurvedic colleges.
 Gramina ayurvedic medical college,Gurukul,Terdal(GAMC)
 Danigond medical college,Terdal

History 
According to a record of 1123 A.D., a major road was connecting Terdal and Halasi, the two important commercial centres in North Karnataka.

Patawardhan DynestySangali State:

In 1821 Terdal was one of the noted Taluka place in the Sangali(Now in Maharastra) princely state.

Economy 
Agriculture is the main economy with some of the important crops like Sugar cane, Maize, Barley (kapali in Marathi), soya bean, Turmeric, are the main crop of Terdal. Most of the population is agriculturists.

Jain temples (ಜೈನ ಬಸದಿಗಳು)
ಜೈನ ಬಸದಿಗಳು
 Shri 1008 Bhagwan Neminath Digambar Jain Basadi (1008 Neminath gonka jinalaya)
 Shri 1008 Bhagwan ajitanatha Digambar Jain Basadi
 Shri 1008 Bhagwan parshwanatha Digambar Jain Basadi,Gurukul campous,Tedal
 Shri 1008 Bhagwan Mahavir Digambar Jain Basadi
 Shri 1008 Bhagwan vasupujya Digambar Jain Basadi,kudachi road,Terdal

Famous Temples 
 Sri Allama Prabhu Temple
 Sri Vittal Temple.
 Sri Anjaneya Temple.
 Shri Ragvendra swami matha.
 Sri VeerBhadreshwara Temple
 Sri Kalmeshwara Temple.
 Sri Venkataramana Temple.
 Sir Dattatreya Temple.
 shri Neelakanteshwar Temple Terdal .
 Hajrat Akkam Shahid & Abbak Shahid Dargah

References

Cities and towns in Bagalkot district